Events from the year 1972 in the United Kingdom.

Incumbents
 Monarch – Elizabeth II
 Prime Minister – Edward Heath (Conservative)
 Parliament – 45th

Events

January
 4 January – Rose Heilbron became the first female judge to sit at the Old Bailey.
 9 January – The National Union of Mineworkers held a strike ballot in which 58.8% voted in favour of industrial action. Coal miners began a strike which would last for seven weeks, including picketing of Saltley coke depot in Birmingham.
 19 January – The government announced the lifting of all restrictions on broadcasting hours on television and radio.
 20 January – Unemployment exceeded the 1,000,000 mark for the first time since the 1930s, almost double the 582,000 who were unemployed when Edward Heath's Conservative government came to power less than two years ago.
 30 January – 'Bloody Sunday' in Northern Ireland: fourteen Catholics were killed when troops opened fire on unarmed demonstrators in Derry.

February
 2 February – Burning of the British Embassy in Dublin: Anti-British riots take place throughout Ireland. The Embassy of the United Kingdom in Merrion Square, Dublin, was burned to the ground, as was several British-owned businesses. In West Berlin, a bomb planted in sympathy with the Provisional IRA at the British Yacht Club explodes fatally.
 3–13 February – Great Britain and Northern Ireland competes at the Winter Olympics in Sapporo, Japan, but does not win any medals.
 5 February – 91 people are hurt and 122 arrested as mounted police charged protestors in London.
 9 February – A state of emergency is declared by the Prime Minister as a result of the miners' strike.
 22 February – 1972 Aldershot bombing: An Official Irish Republican Army bomb kills six people at Aldershot Barracks.
 25 February – The miners' strike ends after seven weeks.

March
 March – Ford announces its new Granada model, available as a saloon, coupé or estate car, which would be built at the Dagenham plant in England as well as the Cologne plant in West Germany. It was designed to compete with the likes of the Rover P6 and Vauxhall Victor, and would be sold as the Ford Consul in mainland Europe. 
 13 March – The United Kingdom and the People's Republic of China elevate diplomatic exchanges to the ambassadorial level after 22 years.
 21 March – Chancellor Anthony Barber announces a £1,200,000,000 tax reduction in the Budget.
 24 March – The British government announces the prorogation of the Parliament of Northern Ireland and the introduction of 'Direct Rule' of Northern Ireland, after the Unionist government refuses to cede security powers.
 26 March – The UK's last trolleybus system, in Bradford, is closed.
 30 March – The Troubles: The Parliament of Northern Ireland is suspended.
 31 March – A CND demonstration is held protesting against the nuclear base at Aldermaston.

April
 1 April – William Whitelaw was appointed as the first Northern Ireland Secretary.
 6 April – Ford launched a new flagship saloon model, the Granada, which replaced the Zephyr on the UK market and would be produced at the Dagenham plant as well as Ford's Cologne plant in West Germany.
 11 April – The BBC Radio 4 parodic panel show I'm Sorry I Haven't a Clue was broadcast for the first time.
 19 April – A report into the Bloody Sunday shootings by the Lord Chief Justice, Lord Widgery, exonerated the British troops of blame because the demonstration had been illegal. This report was later completely discredited by the Saville Inquiry published on 15 June 2010. The British prime minister David Cameron addressed the House of Commons that afternoon where he acknowledged, among other things, that the paratroopers had fired the first shot, had fired on fleeing unarmed civilians, and shot and killed one man who was already wounded. He then apologises on behalf of the British Government.
 22 April – Sylvia Cook and John Fairfax finish rowing across the Pacific.
 30 April – The Brighton Belle Pullman car train made its final journey from London to Brighton.

May
 3 May
 In the first UEFA Cup final, Tottenham Hotspur beat Wolverhampton Wanderers 2–1 in the first leg at the Molineux.
 The General Synod of the Church of England fails to agree union with the Methodist Church.
 6 May – Leeds United won the FA Cup for the first time with a 1–0 win over last year's winners Arsenal at Wembley Stadium. The only goal was a header by Allan Clarke from a Mick Jones pass.
 8 May – Derby County wins the Football League First Division title for the first time in their history.
 12 May – Crown Court is established by the Courts Act 1971 to replace the courts of Assize and Quarter Sessions in England and Wales. Property qualifications requiring jurors to be householders are abolished.
 17 May – Tottenham Hotspur completed a 3-2 aggregate win over Wolverhampton Wanderers at White Hart Lane to win the first UEFA Cup.
 18 May
 Queen Elizabeth II meets her uncle, Edward, Duke of Windsor for the last time, at his home in Paris.
 22 May – The Dominion of Ceylon becomes the Republic of Sri Lanka.
 24 May
 The final stretch of the M6 motorway opens between junctions 6 (Spaghetti Junction) and 7 north of Birmingham, with the fully operational motorway stretching more than 200 miles from Rugby to Carlisle, more than a decade after the first sections were opened.
 Glasgow-based team Rangers F.C. win the UEFA Cup Winners' Cup, defeating FC Dynamo Moscow 3–2 in the final at Camp Nou in Barcelona. A pitch invasion by their supporters leads to the team being banned from defending the trophy the following season.
 26 May – The state-owned travel company Thomas Cook & Son is privatised.
 28 May – Edward, Duke of Windsor, dies of cancer at his home in France aged 77, 35 years after his abdication from the throne.
 30 May
Official Irish Republican Army declares a ceasefire in Northern Ireland.
Battersea Park funfair disaster: Five children die and 13 are injured when a haulage rope on the Big Dipper roller coaster snaps, causing a car to roll backwards and crash.
 The Angry Brigade, a far-left militant group that carried out bomb attacks in England between 1970 and 1972, go on trial.

June
 1 June – Hotels and boarding houses become required to obtain certification under the Fire Precautions Act 1971.
 3 June – A Protestant demonstration in Derry turns into a battle.
 5 June – The funeral of The Duke of Windsor (formerly King Edward VIII) is held at Windsor Castle.
 18 June – British European Airways Flight 548 crashes near Staines and 118 people are killed, making it the UK's worst air disaster at this date. The only two survivors both die by the time they reached a hospital.
 23 June – The Chancellor of the Exchequer Anthony Barber announces a decision for the pound sterling to move to a floating exchange rate. Although intended to be temporary, this remains permanent. Foreign exchange controls were applied to most members of the sterling area.

July
 1 July – The first official gay pride march in London is held.
 21 July – Bloody Friday: Nine people die and over a hundred are injured in a series of IRA explosions in Belfast city centre.
 28 July – A strike by thousands of dockers, leading to the government announcing a state of emergency on 4 August, the last such declaration (as of 2022).
 31 July – The Troubles in Northern Ireland:
 Operation Motorman, 4:00 AM: British Army begins to regain control of the "no-go areas" established by Irish republican paramilitaries in Belfast, Derry ("Free Derry") and Newry.
 Claudy bombing ("Bloody Monday"), 10:00 AM: Three car bombs in Claudy, County Londonderry, kill nine people. It becomes public knowledge only in 2010 that a local Catholic priest was an IRA officer believed to be involved in the bombings but his role was covered up by the authorities.

August
 6 August – Expulsion of Asians from Uganda: Idi Amin, dictator of Uganda, announces that 50,000 Asians with British passports would be expelled from Uganda to the United Kingdom within the next three months as they were "sabotaging the Ugandan economy".
 9 August – The Tim Rice and Andrew Lloyd Webber musical Jesus Christ Superstar makes its West End debut.
 26 August–10 September – Great Britain and Northern Ireland compete at the Olympics in Munich, West Germany, and win 4 gold, 5 silver and 9 bronze medals.
 28 August – Prince William of Gloucester, a cousin of the Queen, is killed in an air crash near Wolverhampton. He was thirty years old, a bachelor and ninth-in-line to the British throne at the time.

September
 1 September – Raising of school leaving age in England and Wales from fifteen to sixteen for pupils leaving school at the end of the academic year began. Many temporary new buildings are erected in secondary modern and comprehensive schools to accommodate the older pupils, while some authorities raised the secondary school transfer age from 11 to 12 or 13. The age was also raised in Scotland and Northern Ireland.
 11 September – The BBC One television quiz programme Mastermind is broadcast for the first time.
 12 September – The sinking of two British trawlers by an Icelandic gunboat triggers the second Cod War. On 30 November, Foreign Secretary Sir Alec Douglas-Home said that Royal Navy ships would be stationed off Iceland to protect British trawlers.
 13 September – Hypermarkets make their debut in the United Kingdom some twenty years after their appearance in France, when French retail giant Carrefour opened a hypermarket in Caerphilly, South Wales.
 18 September – Thousands of Ugandan Asians arrive in the UK after being deported by Idi Amin.
 19 September – A parcel bomb kills a diplomat at the Israeli embassy in London.

October
 Three previously all-male Colleges of the University of Cambridge begin admitting female undergraduates.
 2 October – Following January's lifting of restrictions on broadcasting hours, daytime television is extended. BBC1's afternoon schedule launches with the first edition of a new lunchtime magazine programme Pebble Mill at One from its Birmingham studios.
 10 October – John Betjeman is appointed Poet Laureate.
 13 October – Bank rates are abolished and replaced with the Minimum Lending Rate.
 16 October 
 As part of ITV's new afternoon service, the first episode of Emmerdale Farm, a soap opera set in rural Yorkshire, is broadcast on ITV produced by Yorkshire Television.
 Rioting Maze Prison inmates cause a fire that destroys most of the camp.
 17 October – Elizabeth II visits Yugoslavia.
 19 October – Royce Ryton's play about the Abdication Crisis of Edward VIII, Crown Matrimonial, premieres at the Theatre Royal, Haymarket, London, for the first time included the portrayal of a living member of the Royal Family (Queen Elizabeth The Queen Mother as The Duchess of York) on the legitimate stage.
 22 October – Gordon Banks, the England national football team goalkeeper, suffers a serious eye injury in a car crash in Staffordshire.
 23 October – Access credit cards are introduced.

November
 6 November – The Government introduces freezes on pay, prices, dividends and rents to counter inflation.
 18 November – England women's national football team plays its first official association football match, against Scotland in Greenock, 100 years after the equivalent men's match.
 30 November – Cod War: British Foreign Secretary Sir Alec Douglas-Home says that Royal Navy ships will be stationed to protect British trawlers off Iceland.
 November – Formation in Coventry of the PEOPLE Party, predecessor of the Green Party and the first political party in Europe to promote Green politics.

December
 7 December – The Provisional Irish Republican Army kidnaps Jean McConville in Belfast.
 10 December
 John Hicks is awarded the Nobel Memorial Prize in Economic Sciences with Kenneth Arrow for "pioneering contributions to general economic equilibrium theory and welfare theory."
 Rodney Robert Porter is awarded the Nobel Prize in Physiology or Medicine jointly with Gerald Edelman "for their discoveries concerning the chemical structure of antibodies".
 December – White Paper Education: A Framework for Expansion is published by Margaret Thatcher, Secretary of State for Education, announcing planned increases in nursery provision and of polytechnics and other higher and further education institutions.

Undated
 Inflation falls slightly during the year to 6.4% from 8.6%.
 Marriage rates peak.
 United Reformed Church is formed by merger of most of the Congregational Church of England and Wales with the Presbyterian Church of England.
 British car production peaks at more than 1,900,000 units, despite regular strikes and increasing competition from overseas.
 Honda, the Japanese manufacturer whose motorcycles were already popular with British buyers, begins importing passenger cars to the United Kingdom, beginning only with its small Civic hatchback – one of the first medium-sized cars sold in Europe to feature this bodystyle – which competed with similar sized saloons including the Ford Escort. A larger hatchback and saloon model was due within the next four years to compete with the likes of the Ford Cortina.
 Japanese carmaker Nissan enjoys a surge in sales of its Datsun badged cars, with more than 30,000 cars sold in Britain this year compared to less than 7,000 in 1971. Popularity of imported Japanese products from Mazda and Toyota was also rising.
 Aardman Animations is founded.
 The United Kingdom begins to train Special Air Service for anti-terrorist duties in response to the Munich massacre.

Publications
 Richard Adams novel Watership Down.
 John Berger's novel G.
 Agatha Christie's Hercule Poirot novel Elephants Can Remember.
 Archie Cochrane's Effectiveness and Efficiency: Random Reflections on Health Services, drawing attention to collective ignorance about the outcomes of health care.
 John Yudkin's book on the dangers of sugar in the diet Pure, White and Deadly.
 A Blueprint for Survival first published as a special edition of The Ecologist magazine (January).

Births

January–March
 5 January – Philip Davies, politician
 23 January – Gavin Barwell, politician
 27 January 
 Wynne Evans, Welsh operatic tenor
 Mark Owen, pop singer (Take That)
 9 February – Darren Ferguson, Scottish-born footballer and manager
 11 February – Steve McManaman, footballer
 16 February – Vicki Butler-Henderson, motoring journalist (Auto Express, What Car?), TV presenter (Fifth Gear) and racing driver
 19 February – Malky Mackay, footballer
 20 February – Gareth Unwin, film producer
 6 March – Terry Murphy, snooker player
 20 March – Alex Kapranos, rock singer and guitarist (Franz Ferdinand)
 24 March – Charlie Creed-Miles, actor
 28 March – Nick Frost, actor

April–June
 3 April – Catherine McCormack, actress
 16 April – John McGuinness, motorcycle racer
 17 April – Vicky Lupton, English racewalker
 21 April – Liz Carr, actress and disability rights activist
 22 April – Sarah Patterson, actress
 2 May – Paul Adcock, footballer
 3 May 
 Katya Adler, broadcast journalist
 Steve Barclay, politician
 5 May – James Cracknell, Olympic winning rower
 9 May – Martin Lewis, financial journalist and broadcaster
 15 May – Richard Blackwood, comedian, actor and rapper
 23 May – Martin Saggers, cricketer and umpire
 27 May – Maggie O'Farrell, Northern Irish novelist
 31 May – Archie Panjabi, screen actress
 1 June – Daniel Casey, actor
 3 June – Steve Crane, footballer 
 4 June – Debra Stephenson, actress
 7 June – Curtis Robb, athlete
 27 June – Marc Iliffe, strongman (died 2003)

July–September
 1 July – Christopher Smith, film director and screenwriter
 6 July – Mark Gasser, concert pianist
 10 July – Peter Serafinowicz, actor, voice actor, comedian and writer
 12 July – Jake Wood, actor 
 19 July – David Lammy, politician
 21 July 
 Justin Edwards, actor and writer
 Simon Reeve, television presenter
 6 August 
 Darren Eales, footballer and lawyer
 Geri Halliwell, singer (Spice Girls)
 7 August – Sarah Cawood, television presenter
 15 August – Jonathan Slinger, actor
 16 August – Frankie Boyle, Scottish comedian and writer
 17 August – David Ralph, Scottish field hockey forward
 18 August – Victoria Coren Mitchell, writer, presenter and champion poker player
 6 September 
 Idris Elba, actor
 Martin Gooch, filmmaker
 9 September – Natasha Kaplinsky, newsreader
 18 September – David Jefferies, motorcycle racer (died 2003)
 21 September
 Liam Gallagher, singer (Oasis)
 Richard Maden, breaststroke swimmer
 24 September – Conor Burns, politician
 29 September – Robert Webb, comic actor

October–December
 20 October – Debbie McLeod, Scottish field hockey goalkeeper
 27 October – Lee Clark, English footballer
 2 November – Samantha Janus, actress
 7 November – Danny Grewcock, rugby player
 6 November – Thandiwe Newton, actress
 30 November – Dan Jarvis, army officer and politician
 6 December – Ewan Birney, scientist
 12 December – Nicky Eaden, English footballer and coach
 14 December 
Miranda Hart, actress, comedian
Jonathan Slinger, actor
 20 December – Sarah Jones, politician
 21 December – Gloria De Piero, English journalist and politician, Shadow Minister for Women and Equalities
 29 December – Jude Law, actor

Deaths

January–March
 19 February – John Grierson, documentary film maker (born 1898)
 25 February – S. O. Davies, Welsh miner, trade union official and politician (born 1883 or 1886)
 29 February – Violet Trefusis, writer and socialite (born 1894)
 13 March – Tony Ray-Jones, photographer (born 1941)
 21 March – David McCallum Sr., violinist and the father of David McCallum (born 1897)
 29 March – J. Arthur Rank, industrialist and film producer (born 1888)

April–June
11 May – E. V. Rieu, poet and editor (born 1887)
 22 May
 Cecil Day-Lewis, poet (born 1904)
 Margaret Rutherford, actress (born 1892)
 28 May – the Duke of Windsor (formerly Edward VIII; born 1894)

July–September
 26 August – Francis Chichester, aviator and sailor (born 1901)
 28 August – Prince William of Gloucester (air crash) (born 1941)
 15 September – Geoffrey Fisher, Archbishop of Canterbury (born 1887)
 22 September – Val Parnell, theatrical impresario and television executive (born 1892)

October–December
 1 October – Louis Leakey, palaeontologist (born 1903)
 2 October – Syd Puddefoot, footballer (born 1894)
 15 October – Douglas Smith, broadcaster (born 1924)
 28 November – Havergal Brian, composer (born 1876)
 30 November – Sir Compton Mackenzie, novelist and Scottish nationalist (born 1883)
 6 December – Janet Munro, actress (born 1934)
 13 December – L. P. Hartley, fiction writer (born 1895)
 24 December – Gisela Richter, art historian (born 1882)

See also
 1972 in British music
 1972 in British television
 List of British films of 1972

References

 
Years of the 20th century in the United Kingdom